In algebra, given a module and a submodule, one can construct their quotient module.  This construction, described below, is very similar to that of a quotient vector space. It differs from analogous quotient constructions of rings and groups by the fact that in these cases, the subspace that is used for defining the quotient is not of the same nature as the ambient space (that is, a quotient ring is the quotient of a ring by an ideal, not a subring, and a quotient group is the quotient of a group by a normal subgroup, not by a general subgroup).

  if and only if 

Note that it has to be shown that these operations are well-defined. Then  becomes itself an -module, called the quotient module.

Examples

Consider the ring  of real numbers, and the -module  that is the polynomial ring with real coefficients. Consider the submodule

It follows that the equivalence relation determined by this module will be

This quotient module is isomorphic to the complex numbers, viewed as a module over the real numbers

See also
 Quotient group
 Quotient ring
 Quotient (universal algebra)

References

Module theory
Module